Nicola Rollock is a British academic, writer and activist. She is professor of social policy and race at King's College London, having previously been reader in equality & education at Goldsmiths College, University of London, and has written several books, including The Colour of Class: The educational strategies of the Black middle classes. She has been included in the Powerlist list of the most influential black Britons and been recognised by the PRECIOUS award for her work in racial equality.

Early life and education 
Rollock was born in South West London to parents from Barbados. Her father encouraged her to focus on her education; she enjoyed reading as a child, and eventually studied English literature. She studied psychology at the University of Liverpool and graduated with a bachelor's degree in 1994. Rollock's further education included a Postgraduate Certificate in Family and Couple Therapy at Birkbeck, University of London. She was appointed head of education at the Runnymede Trust in 2001.  For her doctoral studies she moved to the UCL Institute of Education, where she researched the educational attainment of black students in British secondary schools.

Research and career 
After completing her doctorate in 2006, Rollock was appointed a postdoctoral fellow at London Metropolitan University, where she spent three years before returning to the UCL Institute of Education as a research associate. Her research revealed that black children still faced an attainment gap, even if they were as rich as their white counterparts. She has presented her research as evidence to parliament on the attainment of black pupils. Together with the Runnymede Trust, Rollock published The Stephen Lawrence Inquiry 10 Years On, which looked at how British policing must evolve to support the diverse British population. The recommendations included sharing effective practice on recording racist incidents across the criminal justice system, improving the monitoring of racially motivated crime, increasing public scrutiny, addressing the retention and progression of black staff and reviewing the effectiveness of Stop and Search. The report was presented to the Home Office and Ministry of Justice.

In Staying Power, Rollock identified that there were fewer than thirty black British women professors in the United Kingdom in February 2019. This shockingly low number (there are 18,000 professors, over 14,000 of whom are white men) was covered in The Guardian, Vogue and Stylist. Rollock identified that the underrepresentation of black women was due to explicit bias, bullying and racial stereotyping. Rollock is committed to making the black women professors more visible, as well as encouraging and supporting more women in to academia. The Black Female Professors Forum was established by Iyiola Solanke in 2019.

In 2019 Rollock was appointed to the Home Affairs Select Committee Macpherson Report: Twenty Years On inquiry, which will examine progress in the two decades since the Murder of Stephen Lawrence. She was appointed lead on the black and minority ethnic (BAME) attainment gap at Goldsmiths, University of London. In this role she leads a working group that engages academic and professional services staff as well as students to understand the origins of the achievement gap, and implement various solutions. The efforts are part of a wide Government of the United Kingdom initiative to end inequalities between different ethnicities in higher education.

Rollock serves on the Wellcome Trust Diversity & Inclusion Steering Group and the British Science Association Equality, Diversity and Inclusion Advisory Group. She is a member of the BBC Academy. Rollock provides regular comment on racial inequality to the media. She has criticised universities for engaging "with race in superficial ways".

In September 2021, Rollock was appointed Professor of Social Policy and Race at King's College London.

Awards and honours 
Her awards and honours include;

 2015 Woman of Achievement by the Women of the Year Council
 2016 PRECIOUS Award
 2019 Powerlist of Britain's most influential people of African and African Caribbean heritage

Selected publications 
Her publications include;

 
 
 
 

Rollock is the founding editor of the Routledge journal Whiteness and Education. She has written for The Conversation and the Financial Times.

References 

Living people
Black British activists
Black British women academics
Alumni of the University of Liverpool
Academics of the University of Birmingham
Academics of London Metropolitan University
Alumni of the UCL Institute of Education
Year of birth missing (living people)